F. portoricensis may refer to:

 Ficus portoricensis, a banyan found in the Americas
 Finkia portoricensis, a sac fungus
 Forsteronia portoricensis, a plant endemic to Puerto Rico
 Fuscocerrena portoricensis, a bracket fungus